Perho is a municipality of Finland. It is located in the province of Western Finland and is part of the Central Ostrobothnia region.

The municipality is unilingually Finnish. It neighbourhood municipalities are Alajärvi, Halsua, Kinnula, Kivijärvi, Kyyjärvi, Lestijärvi, Veteli and Vimpeli.

The name of Perho refers to the word perhonen, which means butterfly in Finnish; due to this, the golden butterfly appears in the coat of arms of the municipality. In the same coat of arms, the silver "nail cross" above the butterfly refers to J. L. Runeberg's poem The Tomb in Perho. The coat of arms was designed by Gustaf von Numers and was confirmed for use on March 6, 1953.

History
In 1860, the large parish of Kokkola, which covers almost present-day Central Ostrobothnia, disintegrated and the parish of Veteli, which included the smaller parishes of Kaustinen, Halsua and Perho, was separated from it. Perho officially became a chapel parish five years later. Perho became an independent parish in 1879, and the first pastor took office in 1885. The first public library in the Kokkola region was established in Perho. As the former librarian of Vähäkyrö's library in the 1850s, Taittonen had made it the largest public library in the country.

Transport
Highway 13, which connects the Central Finland region and the town of Kokkola, passes through Perho and also serves as a main street of village. There are two roundabouts in the village center.

Perho is served by OnniBus.com route Helsinki—Jyväskylä—Kokkola.

Culture

Food
In the 1980s, turnip rieskas, flour-potato porridge and mashed lingonberry sauce were named Perho's traditional parish dishes.

Notable people
 Arsi Harju (born 1974), former track and field athlete
 Rami Hietaniemi (born 1982), wrestler
 Lauri Linna (1930–2018), politician
 Marita Liulia (born 1957), visual artist
 Eero Tuomaala (1926–1988), long-distance runner

Twinnings
 Antsla, Estonia

Gallery

See also
 Perho River

References

External links

Municipality of Perho – Official website

 
Populated places established in 1868